William Meynard (born 11 July 1987) is a French swimmer. He won a bronze medal in the Men's 100 metre freestyle at the 2011 World Aquatics Championships in Shanghai, with a time of 48.00.

References

1987 births
Living people
French male freestyle swimmers
World Aquatics Championships medalists in swimming
Olympic swimmers of France
Swimmers at the 2016 Summer Olympics
European Aquatics Championships medalists in swimming
Medalists at the FINA World Swimming Championships (25 m)
Medalists at the 2016 Summer Olympics
Olympic silver medalists for France
Olympic silver medalists in swimming
Mediterranean Games gold medalists for France
Mediterranean Games medalists in swimming
Swimmers at the 2009 Mediterranean Games